Andreas Christopher Linde (born 24 July 1993) is a Swedish professional footballer who plays for 2. Bundesliga club Greuther Fürth as a goalkeeper.

Club career

Molde
Linde signed for Norwegian club Molde in 2015, having agreed a two-year contract with the club. In December 2016, Molde extended his contract till the end of the 2019 season. On 21 July 2015, Linde made his debut for the club in Molde's 5–0 win against Armenian side Pyunik in the 2015–16 UEFA Europa League second qualifying round, second leg. He was sent off in the 72nd minute of his league debut for Molde against Odd on 9 August 2015. Molde led the game 2–1 when Linde fouled an Odd player and gave away a penalty. The match ended with a 2–2 draw.  In May, he injured his knee and had to go through surgery.

On 12 July 2019, Molde announced that Linde's contract had been extended till the end of the 2021 season. He returned to the first team squad on 23 September 2019, in a match against Stabæk, and placed in the starting XI on 6 October against Brann. He kept a clean sheet in a goalless draw at Brann Stadion, his first league game since 20 May.

Greuther Fürth
On 10 January 2022, Linde signed a contract with German club Greuther Fürth until the summer of 2024.

International career 
Linde was part of the Sweden U21 team that won the 2015 UEFA European Under-21 Championship, serving as a backup goalkeeper behind Patrik Carlgren.

He represented the Sweden Olympic team at the 2016 Summer Olympics in Rio de Janeiro, and played in all three games as Sweden failed to advance from the group stage.

On 12 January 2017, he made his full international debut for Sweden in a 6–0 friendly win against Slovakia.

Career statistics

Club

International

Honours
Molde
Eliteserien: 2019

Sweden U21
UEFA European Under-21 Championship: 2015

References

External links

1993 births
Living people
Association football goalkeepers
Swedish footballers
Sweden international footballers
Sweden under-21 international footballers
Sweden youth international footballers
Footballers at the 2016 Summer Olympics
Olympic footballers of Sweden
Swedish people of Dutch descent
Allsvenskan players
Division 2 (Swedish football) players
Eliteserien players
Bundesliga players
Helsingborgs IF players
IFK Värnamo players
Molde FK players
SpVgg Greuther Fürth players
Swedish expatriate footballers
Expatriate footballers in Norway
Swedish expatriate sportspeople in Norway
Expatriate footballers in Germany
Swedish expatriate sportspeople in Germany